Pleodendron is a genus of plants in family Canellaceae described as a genus in 1899.

Pleodendron is native to Central America and the West Indies.

Species
 Pleodendron costaricense N.Zamora, Hammel & Aguilar - Costa Rica
 Pleodendron ekmanii Urb. - Haiti
 Pleodendron macranthum (Baill.) Tiegh. - Puerto Rico

References

Canellaceae
Canellales genera
Taxonomy articles created by Polbot
Neotropical realm flora